Per-Olov Richardsson (born 17 January 1942 in Undersåker) is a Swedish former alpine skier who competed in the 1968 Winter Olympics, finishing 43rd in the men's downhill.

External links
 sports-reference.com
 

1942 births
Swedish male alpine skiers
Alpine skiers at the 1968 Winter Olympics
Olympic alpine skiers of Sweden
People from Åre Municipality
Living people
Sportspeople from Jämtland County
20th-century Swedish people